Lazar Fleishman (born 1944) is a Russian historian and literary scholar and Professor of Slavic Languages and Literatures at Stanford University. He is known for his expertise on comparative literature.

References

Living people
Comparative literature academics
1944 births
Stanford University faculty
University of Tartu alumni
University of Latvia alumni
20th-century Russian historians